Keila is a river in Northern Estonia.

One of the most stunning attractions along the river is the Keila Waterfall (Keila juga).

Keila River Park 
Situated on the grounds of the former Keila Manor and along the Keila River, the park's (Keila Jõepark) history dates back to the 17th century. Ruins of a prehistoric sacrificial stone and a small castle can be seen while strolling around the beautiful park.

Several bat species also inhabit the vicinity and can be seen soaring throughout the park on summer nights.

Gallery

See also
Keila Waterfall

References

External links

Rivers of Estonia
Landforms of Harju County
Landforms of Rapla County